Danie Visser (born 26 July 1961) is a former professional tennis player from South Africa. A doubles specialist, he won three Grand Slam men's doubles titles (two Australian Open and one US Open). Visser reached the world No. 1 doubles ranking in January 1990.

Tennis career
Visser won the first of 17 career doubles titles in 1985 at Bristol. In 1990 he won the men's doubles titles at both the Australian Open and the US Open, partnering his fellow South African player Pieter Aldrich. The pair were also doubles runners-up at Wimbledon that year. Visser won the Australian Open doubles crown again in 1993, partnering Laurie Warder. Visser won the final doubles title of his career in 1994 at Manchester.

Visser's best singles ranking was world No. 59, which he attained in 1984.

He attended Afrikaanse Hoër Seunskool (Afrikaans High School for Boys, also known as Affies), a popular and renowned public school located in Pretoria.

Grand Slam finals

Doubles (3 wins, 1 loss)

ATP career finals

Doubles: 42 (17 titles, 25 runner-ups)

ATP Challenger and ITF Futures finals

Doubles: 3 (2–1)

Performance timelines

Singles

Doubles

Mixed Doubles

References

External links
 
 
 

1961 births
Living people
Afrikaner people
South African people of Dutch descent
People from Rustenburg
South African male tennis players
Grand Slam (tennis) champions in men's doubles
Australian Open (tennis) champions
US Open (tennis) champions
ATP number 1 ranked doubles tennis players